On 15 January 2018, a partially constructed bridge in Chirajara, Guayabetal, Colombia collapsed, killing at least 10 workers and injuring several more. The  cable-stayed bridge, located in the Cundinamarca Department, was part of an expansion of National Route 40 between Bogota and Villavicencio scheduled to open in March 2018.

Events
Newspaper reports indicate that only 20 of the expected 200 workers were on the section that fell, due to the fact that most of the workers were attending a training session on the opposite side.

Coviandes was the agency in charge of the project. Subcontractors were two different companies, GISAICO S.A. and ICMO S.A.S. 

The investigation into the failure of the western pier was conducted by the American company Modjeski and Masters. Coviandes published the results of the investigation by Modjeski & Masters in April 2018.  The report concluded that the collapse of Tower B (the west pier) of the cable-stayed bridge was due to a design error, with an incorrect assumption made about the strength provided by a transverse tie beams and diaphragm at the diamond shaped pier.  The report ruled out suggestions that the accident was due to poor quality of materials.  The report also found cracking on Tower C, which remained standing, which was consistent with the early stages of the collapse mechanism and recommended its demolition.  The report found that the foundations  structural and geotechnical capacities were adequate for this type of bridge and could be retained for the reconstruction.

The remaining second pier pylon was demolished in July 2018.

References

2018 in Colombia
Bridge disasters in Colombia
January 2018 events in South America
Cundinamarca Department
Transport disasters in 2018
2018 disasters in Colombia